Constellation Observing System for Meteorology, Ionosphere, and Climate (COSMIC) is a program designed to provide advances in meteorology, ionospheric research, climatology, and space weather by using GPS satellites in conjunction with low Earth orbiting (LEO) satellites. The term "COSMIC" may refer to either the organization itself or the constellation  of 6 satellites (also known as COSMIC-1 and as FORMOSAT-3, 福爾摩沙衛星三號, in Taiwan). The constellation is a joint U.S.-Taiwanese project with major participants including the University Corporation for Atmospheric Research (UCAR), the National Science Foundation, the Naval Research Laboratory (NRL), the Air Force Research Laboratory (AFRL), SRI International on the U.S. side and the National Space Organization (NSPO) on the Taiwanese side.

The total cost of the spacecraft and launch was US$100 million, 80% of which was being provided by NSPO, and the remainder by various U.S. agencies.

After experiencing several delays, the launch of the COSMIC satellite constellation atop a Minotaur launch vehicle from Vandenberg AFB occurred at 01:40 GMT, on 15 April 2006, despite heavy fog. The satellites, which orbit at an altitude of 500 miles, required over a year to move into the correct positions to provide full global coverage.

A follow-up constellation, COSMIC-2, launched 25 June 2019 on a Falcon Heavy rocket.

Instruments

The COSMIC satellites are equipped with three primary forms of instrumentation for remote sensing, including:
GPS Radio Occultation Experiment
Tri-band beacon (TBB), in VHF, UHF and L-band
Tiny Ionospheric Photometer (TIP)

Deployment
All 6 microsatellites were launched on a single launch vehicle and deployed into a single parking orbit after launch. The spacecraft were then deployed into separate orbital planes through the use of precession due to the oblateness of the Earth and raised to a final orbital altitude over the course of several months. Scientific data were collected during the deployment process, along with experimental validation and calibration.

Status

FM2's power system lost 50% of its output in February 2007, while FM3's solar panel also malfunctioned since August 2007. As a result, both satellites are operating in a degraded state, capable of returning data only during specific solar angles. FM6 went out of control in September 2007, but control was restored by 16 November of the same year.
FM3 had severe power problems since 6 July 2010. It was declared not functional since then. FM4, FM5, and FM6 have had battery aging problem.

The data published by the COSMIC-1 constellation has been used in weather models to improve the quality of weather forecasts. On 1 May 2020, the satellite constellation was retired.

Orbital information

Parking orbit
Altitude: 500 km
Inclination: 72 degrees
Eccentricity: 0

Final orbital configuration
Altitude: 700 – 800 km
Inclination: 72 degrees
Eccentricity: 0
Spacing between right ascension of ascending node: 24 degrees
Spacing in mean anomaly between adjacent orbital planes: 45 degrees

See also

 CHAMP
 FORMOSAT-7/COSMIC-2, replacement mission launched in 2019
 Gravity Recovery and Climate Experiment (GRACE)
 MetOp, a European weather satellite that also carries a GPS radio occultation receiver
 National Space Organization
 The TaiWan Ionospheric Model
 2006 in spaceflight

References

External links

Official site
COSMIC Mission Profile by NASA's Solar System Exploration
University Corporation for Atmospheric Research (UCAR)
UCAR Office of Programs (UOP)
National SPace Organization  (NSPO) - COSMIC's Taiwanese counterpart.
ScienceNOW: The Little Satellite Fleet That Could,

Spacecraft launched in 2006
Spacecraft launched by Minotaur rockets
Earth observation satellites of Taiwan
Earth observation satellites of the United States